The Lithuanian National Prize for Culture and Arts honors achievements in Lithuanian culture and arts. It is traditionally awarded on February 16, commemorating the Act of Independence of Lithuania. The awards are conferred by the Lithuanian Ministry of Culture.

1989
 Jonas Juškaitis – poet,
 Algirdas Martinaitis – composer,
 Šarūnas Sauka – painter,
 Kornelijus Matuzevičius – film director,
 Henrikas Šablevičius – movie director,
 Čiurlionis String Quartet, performers:
 Rimantas Šiugždinis – 1st violin,
 Saulius Kiškis – 2nd violin,
 Aloyzas Grižas – alto,
 Saulius Lipčius – cello.

1990
 Julius Juzeliūnas – composer,
 Kazys Napoleonas Kitkauskas – architect,
 Algirdas Steponavičius – painter,
 Zita Žemaitytė – art critic,
 Romualdas Požerskis – photographer.

1991
 Vytautas Bložė – poet,
 Jeronimas Kačinskas – composer,
 Gediminas Karalius – sculptor,
 Bronius Radzevičius (posthumous) – writer,
 Povilas Ričardas Vaitekūnas – painter.

1992
 Valentinas Antanavičius – painter,
 Kazys Bradūnas – poet,
 Vladas Drėma – art critic,
 Petras Geniušas – pianist,
 Arvydas Šliogeris – philosopher.

1993
 Petras Bingelis – choir conductor,
 Viktorija Daujotytė – literary critic,
 Vytautas Kavolis – sociologist,
 Vytautas Kašuba – sculptor,
 Laimonas Noreika – actor

1994
 Sigitas Geda – poet,
 Gintaras Rinkevičius – conductor,
 Algirdas Dovydėnas – painter,
 Regimantas Midvikis – painter,
 Algirdas Žebrauskas – architect,
 Ričardas Krištopavičius – architect,
 Arūnas Sakalauskas – painter,
 Rimas Tuminas – theatre director.

1995
 Aleksandras Macijauskas – photographer,
 Raimundas Katilius – violinist,
 Bronius Kutavičius – composer,
 Algirdas Petrulis – painter,
 Vytautas Šerys – painter,
 Jonas Mekas – movie director,
 Antanas Rubšys – translator.

1996
 Osvaldas Balakauskas – composer,
 Stanislovas Kuzma – sculptor,
 Valentinas Masalskis – actor,
 Vladimiras Prudnikovas – opera vocal soloist,
 Jonas Strielkūnas – poet,
 Eglė Špokaitė – ballet dancer,
 Vytautas Valius – painter.

1997
 Alfonsas Nyka-Niliūnas (birth name Alfonsas Cipkus) – poet and writer,
 Onutė Narbutaitė – composer,
 Petras Repšys – painter,
 Juozas Erlickas – writer,
 Anatolijus Šenderovas – composer,
 Rūta Ibelhauptienė and Zbignevas Ibelhauptas – piano duo,
 Eimuntas Nekrošius – theatre director.

1998
 Vidmantas Bartulis – composer,
 Feliksas Jakubauskas – painter,
 Algimantas Kunčius – photographer,
 Marcelijus Martinaitis – poet,
 Donatas Sauka – writer,
 Aldona Šaltenienė – painter,
 Alfredas Bumblauskas – historian,
 Algimantas Galinis – TV director,
 Edvardas Gudavičius – historian,
 Albertas Žostautas – editor.

1999
 Jūratė Onaitytė – actress,
 Donaldas Kajokas – poet,
 Kęstutis Pempė – architect,
 Gytis Ramunis – architect,
 Augustinas Savickas – painter,
 Linas Leonas Katinas – painter,
 Mindaugas Navakas – sculptor,
 Albertas Zalatorius – literary critic,
 Saulius Sondeckis – artistic director and conductor of the Lithuanian Chamber Orchestra,
 Ona Narbutienė – musicologist.

2000
 Eugenijus Cukermanas – painter,
 Dalia Kasčiūnaitė – painter,
 Romualdas Granauskas – writer,
 Tomas Venclova – writer,
 Nijolė Miliauskaitė – writer,
 Irena Milkevičiūtė – opera vocal soloist,
 Juozas Domarkas – conductor of the Lithuanian National Symphonic orchestra,
 Vladas Bagdonas – actor,
 Adomas Jacovskis – painter.

2001
 Leonardas Gutauskas – writer,
 Šarūnas Bartas – movie director,
 Justinas Marcinkevičius – poet,
 Feliksas Bajoras – composer,
 Violeta Urmana – opera singer,
 Leonoras Vytautas Strioga – sculptor,
 Stasys Eidrigevičius – painter,
 Donatas Katkus – conductor, musicologist,
 Kostas Smoriginas – actor.

2002
 Robertas Antinis – sculptor,
 Petras Vyšniauskas – jazz saxophonist,
 Oskaras Koršunovas – theatre director,
 Jurgis Juozapaitis – composer,
 Arvydas Každailis – painter,
 Audrius Stonys – movie director,
 Jonas Mikelinskas – writer,
 Kornelijus Platelis – writer,
 David Geringas – cellist.

2003
 Algimantas Jonas Kuras – painter,
 Jonas Aleksa – conductor,
 Vytautas Juozapaitis – opera singer,
 Vytautas Barkauskas – composer,
 Antanas Jonynas – writer,
 Petras Dirgėla – writer,
 Bitė Vilimaitė – writer,
 Antanas Sutkus – photographer,
 Jonas Vaitkus – theatre director.

2004
 Ona Baliukonė – writer,
 Sigitas Parulskis – writer,
 Jūratė Paulėkaitė – scenographer,
 Petras Mazūras – sculptor,
 Mikalojus Povilas Vilutis – silk-screen artist,
 Rytis Mažulis – composer,
 Sigutė Stonytė – opera singer,
 Stanislovas Žvirgždas – photographer,
 Vilnius State quartet performers:
 Audronė Vainiūnaitė, 1st violin,
 Artūras Šilalė, 2nd violin,
 Girdutis Jakaitis, alto,
 Augustinas Vasiliauskas, cello.

2005
 Gintaras Varnas – theatre director,
 Laima Oržekauskienė – textile artist,
 Juozas Aputis – writer,
 Jurga Ivanauskaitė – writer,
 Ksenija Jaroševaitė – sculptor,
 Vytautas Laurušas – composer,
 Aidas Marčėnas – poet,
 Arūnas Matelis – movie director,
 Robertas Šervenikas – conductor.

2006
 Saulius Juškys – architect,
 Kęstutis Navakas – writer and poet,
 Nijolė Lukšionytė-Tolvaišienė – architectural historian,
 Vytautas Balčytis – photographer,
 Jonas Vytautas Bruveris – musicologist,
 Rimvydas Kepežinskas – calligrapher and graphic artist,
 Mūza Rubackytė – pianist,
 Rimantas Sakalauskas – sculptor and ceramics artist
 Algirdas Vizgirda – flutist.

2007
 Vytautas Kernagis – artist and musician,
 Alfonsas Andriuškevičius – art critic,
 Šarūnas Nakas – composer,
 Vytautas Paukštė – actor,
 Nomeda Urbonienė and Gediminas Urbonas – artists,
 Zinaida Nagytė-Katiliškienė (Lūnė Sutema) – poet.

2008
 Antanas Gailius – poet and translator,
 Vanda Juknaitė – writer,
 Regina Rūta Staliliūnaitė Matulionienė – actress,
 Deimantas Narkevičius – media artist,
 Veronika Povilionienė – singer,
 Raminta Šerkšnytė – composer.

2009
 Almantas Grikevičius – movie director,
 Jonas Rimgaudas Jurašas – theater director,
 Romualdas Rakauskas – photographer,
 Marija Matušakaitė – art critic,
 Ramutė Skučaitė – writer,
 Rolandas Kazlas – actor.

2010
 Virgilijus Noreika – singer,
 Icchokas Meras – writer,
 Vaclovas Augustinas – composer and conductor,
 Rolandas Rastauskas – writer,
 Povilas Mataitis and Dalia Lidija Mataitienė – theater director and theater artist,
 Jonas Paulius Gasiūnas – painter.

2011
 Vytautas Arūnas Žebriūnas – film director,
 Algimantas Aleksandravičius – photographer,
 Vytautas Landsbergis – musicologist,
 Kęstutis Grigaliūnas – visual artist,
 Henrikas Algis Čigriejus – writer,
 Asta Krikščiūnaitė – singer.

2012
 Vladas Vildžiūnas – sculptor,
 Kęstutis Nastopka – literary critic,
 Vitalijus Mazūras – scenographer,
 Eugenijus Miliūnas – architect,
 Žilvinas Kempinas – visual artist,
 Modestas Pitrėnas – conductor.

2013
 Donatas Banionis – actor,
 Faustas Latėnas – composer,
 Giedrius Kuprevičius – composer,
 Vladas Braziūnas – writer,
 Juozas Budraitis – actor,
 Jonas Gricius – cinematographer.

2014
 Regimantas Adomaitis – actor,
 Jakovas Grigorijus Kanovičius – writer,
 Rolandas Palekas – architect,
 Nelė Savičenko – actress,
 Eimutis Valentinas Sventickas – writer, critic,
 Algirdas Šeškus – photo artist.

2015
Algirdas Jonas Ambrazas – musicologist,
Leopoldas Digrys – musician, 
Dainius Gavenonis – actor,
Giedra Radvilavičiūtė – writer,
Vladas Urbanavičius – sculptor,
 – graphic artist.

2016
Audrius Ambrasas – architect,
Vytautas Anužis – actor,
Viačeslavas Ganelinas, Vladimiras Tarasovas, Vladimiras Čekasinas – Jazz musicians,
Rūta Katiliūtė – painter,
Gytis Lukšas – director,
Valdas Papievis – writer.

2017

Eglė Gabrėnaitė – actor
Justė Gintvilė Janulytė – composer
Danutė Dalia Kunickienė – writer
Gintaras Makarevičius – scenographer
Svajonė and Paulius Stanikai – visual artists
Gintautas Trimakas – photographer

2018
 Vytautas Martinkus – writer
 Mirga Gražinytė – conductor
 Marius Ivaškevičius – writer
 Audrius Kemežys – cinematographer
 Darius Meškauskas – actor
 Artūras Raila – visual artists

2019
 Algimantas Puipa – film director
 Saulius Šaltenis – writer
 Asmik Grigorian − opera soloist
 Zita Bružaitė – composer
 Viktorija Kuodytė − actor
 Rugilė Barzdžiukaitė − artist
 Vaiva Grainytė − artist
 Lina Lapelyte − artist

2020

 - cinematographer
 - writer
 - musicologist
 - actress
 - architect
 - artist

2021

 - actor  
 - art critic
Vytautas Miškinis - choir conductor, composer
 - photographer
 - creator of interdisciplinary art
 - ethnomusicologist

2022
The winners were announced on December 12. The selection was made from 30 nominations shortlisted to 12.
Kazimieras Saja, writer, " for hunting "mammoths" in theater and prose"
Mantas Kvedaravičius, posthumously, for his documentaries 
, poet, "for the classical gene in contemporary poetry"
, opera singer, "for his successful creative activities promoting the Lithuanian singing school on world stages"
Žibuoklė Martinaitytė-Rosaschi, composer, "for the depth of light and darkness in contemporary music"
Giedrė Žickytė, film director, "for a vigorous and impressive creative leap"

References

External links
  Laureates list at Lithuanian Culture Ministry website
 List of Prize Recipients Website of Lithuanian Professional Writers. Accessed August 26, 2007

 
Lithuanian National Prize
National Prize